Olds was a provincial electoral district in Alberta, Canada, mandated to return a single member to the Legislative Assembly of Alberta from 1909 to 1963.

The district was combined with the Didsbury electoral district to form Olds-Didsbury. The district was named after the Town of Olds, Alberta.

Olds history

The electoral district of Olds was created and first contested for the 1909 Alberta general election. The electoral district included much of the area of the Rosebud electoral district contested in the 1905 election. The first election was won by Liberal candidate Duncan Marshall, who would roll up a large majority in his first win. Marshall was appointed to the cabinet as Minister of Agriculture and Provincial Secretary shortly after the election.

Marshall was confirmed in a Ministerial by-election romping to an easy win over Socialist Candidate Samuel Welsh later that year. He lost his portfolios as the Alexander Rutherford government fell in 1910 due to the Alberta and Great Waterways Railway scandal. Premier Sifton later re-appointed him to that post.

Marshall nearly lost his seat in the 1913 general election and won by a bigger majority in 1917. He was defeated by Nelson Smith a candidate for the United Farmers of Alberta in a hotly contested race in the 1921 general election, that saw the United Farmers form their first majority government.

Spencer was re-elected to his second term in 1926 and retired from the legislature in 1930. He was replaced by Frank Grisdale, who held the seat for the United Farmers. Grisdale was appointed Minister of Agriculture in 1934 and served in portfolio for one year.  Social Credit swept to power in the 1935 general election, Grisdale would be easily defeated by Social Credit candidate Herbert Ash.

Ash would serve a single term in office. He was removed from caucus by the Aberhart controlled Social Credit Advisory Board that nominated candidates and not allowed to run under the Social Credit banner for the 1944 Alberta general election.  He became an Independent Social Credit candidate and ran anyway. The 1944 general election would see Ash and Grisdale both run as Independents. They were defeated by Social Credit candidate Norman Cook.

Cook held the district for three terms before dying in 1950. Social Credit would field candidate Frederick Niddrie who retained the seat for the party. He was re-elected in the 1952 and 1955 general elections before dying and vacating the seat in 1959. In the third by-election held in the riding Social Credit fielded Roderick Macleod who retained the district for his party. He would be re-elected for the second time in a year in the 1959 Alberta general election and kept his seat until the district was abolished in 1963.

Election results

1909 general election

1909 by-election

Duncan Marshall having just been elected to the Legislature was appointed to the cabinet as Minister of Agriculture and Provincial Secretary by Premier Alexander Rutherford. Under election laws in force at the time, a ministerial confirmation by-election had to be called. Marshall was the only new appointment to the Rutherford cabinet after the 1909 general election.

Marshall was unanimously confirmed as the Liberal candidate for the by-election and his portfolio endorsed by the membership at a nomination meeting attended by over 100 delegates on November 3, 1909. Speakers at the meeting included federal MP Michael Clark and Senator Peter Talbot.

The Conservatives decided not to oppose Duncan Marshall, but the Socialist Party led by Charles O'Brien, who had just won their first seat in the 1909 general election decided to run a candidate in Olds to oppose Marshall. O'Brien personally managed and ran the campaign of candidate Samuel Welsh.

The Socialists campaigned primarily a platform of nationalizing all farms to be controlled by the state. They also promoted abolishing wages and private property. The Socialists termed their campaign and supporters as "The Red Revolutionaries".

On election day, the riding saw a significant reduction in voter turnout with a light vote being polled compared to the 1909 general election. Marshall was re-elected with a landslide super majority taking almost 87% of the vote to keep his seat and ministerial post.

1913 general election

1917 general election

1921 general election

1926 general election

1930 general election

1935 general election

1940 general election

1944 general election

1948 general election

1950 by-election

1952 general election

1955 general election

1959 by-election

1959 general election

Plebiscite results

1957 liquor plebiscite

On October 30, 1957 a stand-alone plebiscite was held province wide in all 50 of the then current provincial electoral districts in Alberta. The government decided to consult Alberta voters to decide on liquor sales and mixed drinking after a divisive debate in the Legislature. The plebiscite was intended to deal with the growing demand for reforming antiquated liquor control laws.

The plebiscite was conducted in two parts. Question A asked in all districts, asked the voters if the sale of liquor should be expanded in Alberta, while Question B asked in a handful of districts within the corporate limits of Calgary and Edmonton asked if men and woman were allowed to drink together in establishments.

Province wide Question A of the plebiscite passed in 33 of the 50 districts while Question B passed in all five districts. Olds voted against the proposal by a wide margin. The voter turnout in the district was well below the province wide average of 46%.

Official district returns were released to the public on December 31, 1957. The Social Credit government in power at the time did not considered the results binding. However the results of the vote led the government to repeal all existing liquor legislation and introduce an entirely new Liquor Act.

Municipal districts lying inside electoral districts that voted against the Plebiscite such as Olds were designated Local Option Zones by the Alberta Liquor Control Board and considered effective dry zones, business owners that wanted a license had to petition for a binding municipal plebiscite in order to be granted a license.

Historical boundaries and maps

See also
List of Alberta provincial electoral districts
Olds, Alberta, a town in central Alberta

References

Further reading

External links
Elections Alberta
The Legislative Assembly of Alberta

Former provincial electoral districts of Alberta